Kasumba is a surname. Notable people with the surname include:

Florence Kasumba (born 1976), Ugandan-born German actress and voice actress
Jane Kasumba, Ugandan media personality and journalist
Leslie 'Lee' Kasumba (born 1980), Ugandan radio and TV presenter
Samson Kasumba (born 1974), Ugandan pastor and TV personality